Vladimir Petrovich Potapov (24 January 1914 – 21 December 1980) was a Soviet mathematician. He was born in Odesa and died in Kharkiv.

External links 
Vladimir Petrovich Potapov at the MacTutor History of Mathematics archive

Soviet mathematicians
1914 births
1980 deaths
People from Odesa
Academic staff of K. D. Ushinsky South Ukrainian National Pedagogical University